Westbourne Park is a London Underground station in the Notting Hill area of the Royal Borough of Kensington and Chelsea. It is on the Circle and Hammersmith and City lines, between Ladbroke Grove and Royal Oak stations, and is in Travelcard Zone 2.

History
Although the Metropolitan Railway (MR) had been extended to Notting Hill and Hammersmith on 1 June 1864, the first station by this name did not open until 1 February 1866. In 1867, with the companies on better terms, the MR bought a share of the Hammersmith & City Railway (H&CR) from the Great Western Railway (GWR), after which it eliminated the broad gauge track and operated almost all the trains (the H&CR's identity being effectively lost).

The original station closed on 31 October 1871, and was replaced the following day by a new station, constructed to the west of the original. To remove this traffic from its own busy main line, the GWR built a new pair of tracks from Paddington to Westbourne Park, and on 12 May 1878 it opened a dive-under to remove conflicts where the service crossed the main line. A bomb planted by the Suffragettes was discovered at the station on 16 May 1913.

The Circle line was extended to Hammersmith in 2009. The line now operates between Hammersmith and Edgware Road via a single complete circuit of the previous route. This was done with the aim of improving reliability by providing a place for trains to terminate after each trip rather than letting delays accumulate. However, it means that no trains through Notting Hill Gate go east of Edgware Road.

National Rail platforms

The GWR opened platforms on the Great Western Main Line on 30 October 1871, but these closed in March 1992. The Up line through the station had a  speed limit, which was unacceptable for the planned Heathrow Express services; instead of modifying the station's platforms; British Rail decided that it would be more cost-effective to dispense with them, and closure notices were Retrieved 13 December 1990.

Royal Oak, another station on the Hammersmith & City line, was also once served by the GWR, but its services were withdrawn in 1934. Today, the first stop out of Paddington is at Acton Main Line. Industrial archaeologists have found the remains of buildings including a broad gauge train shed for Brunel's original lines, a turntable, and engine sheds in excavations east of the station as part of the land clearance work for the Crossrail project.

Connections
London Bus routes 7, 18, 23, 28, 31, 36, 70 and 328, and night routes N28 and N31 serve the station. In addition, bus route 23 provides a 24-hour bus service.

In popular culture
The station was featured in the video of the Boris Gardiner song "I Want to Wake Up with You".

Notes and references

Notes

References

Bibliography

Circle line (London Underground) stations
Hammersmith & City line stations
Great Western Main Line
Tube stations in the City of Westminster
Former Hammersmith and City Railway stations
Railway stations in Great Britain opened in 1866
Former Great Western Railway stations
Railway stations in Great Britain opened in 1871
Railway stations in Great Britain closed in 1992
1866 establishments in England
Westbourne, London
Tube stations in the Royal Borough of Kensington and Chelsea